Kintore is an abandoned town in Western Australia located  north-west of Kalgoorlie along the Coolgardie North Road in the Goldfields-Esperance region of Western Australia.

Gold was discovered in the area in December 1894 by prospectors Leith and Barrett. The first mine was named after Algernon Keith-Falconer, 9th Earl of Kintore, the retiring Governor of South Australia who was visiting Western Australia at the time. Following a rapid growth in population the local progress committee petitioned for the town to be declared and the town was gazetted in 1897.

By 1898 the population of the town was 240 (200 males and 40 females).

References 

Goldfields-Esperance
Ghost towns in Western Australia